With its approximately 9,300 inhabitants the Nordstadt is the youngest of the 27 boroughs of Karlsruhe. It was founded on 1 January 1996.

History
Besides areas that used to be part of the Weststadt-borough (Hardtwaldsiedlung a housing cooperative, founded in the 1920s), large parts of today's borough consist of the former United States Army Smiley Barracks (Originally built in 1937 as the Forstner-Kaserne) and the American Paul Revere Village housing area (founded in 1951). For that reason most streets, in what used to be Paul Revere Village, still carry the name of U.S. states. After the US forces left Karlsruhe in 1995 new apartment building were erected and existing apartment buildings renovated with storeys being added.       

The newly constructed Smiley West housing estate (nickname "Legoland") was built adjacent to the former Smiley Barracks.

Education
The former Karlsruhe American Elementary School is now home of the Maryland Grundschule and the former Karlsruhe American High School  to an independent school, the Heisenberg-Gymnasium. In 1995 the Duale Hochschule Baden-Württemberg Karlsruhe moved to an area close to the former airfield.

Religious life
The catholic Herz-Jesu-Church, originally founded in 1924 as a temporary structure, is located south of the Hardtwaldsiedlung housing cooperative.

The Synagogue of Karlsruhe, newly constructed in 1971, is situated in Nordstadt.

The former North Chapel of Paul Revere Village was home to several congregations. From 1996-2011, operated jointly by the Protestant and Catholic Church, the building was used as the Maria Magdalena Ecumenical Community Centre (Ökumenisches Gemeindezentrum Maria Magdalena) and also home to the pentecostal All Christian Believers Fellowship. Since 2012 the building is owned by the Serbian Orthodox Church (Hram Svete Petke - Congregation).

Sport
Using the facilities left behind by the US forces, the Nordstadt is home to the Karlsruhe Cougars Baseball team.

The NCO-Club
The former NCO-Club, still carrying the name  NCO-Club, serves a youth centre.

References

External links 
 Maryland Primary School - State School
 Jewish Congregation of Karlsruhe
 Nordstadt citizens group
 Video: Smiley Barracks - Karlsruhe Military Community - May 1989

Karlsruhe
Boroughs of Karlsruhe
Neighbourhoods in Germany